The 2008 Irish Classic (often known as the 2008 Lucan Racing Irish Classic for sponsorship and promotion purposes) was a professional non-ranking snooker tournament that took place on 2 and 3 August 2008 at the Celbridge Snooker Club in Kildare, Republic of Ireland.

Ken Doherty won in the final 5–2 against Fergal O'Brien.

Main draw

References

2008
Irish Classic
Classic